Charles Bowyer Adderley, 1st Baron Norton   (2 August 181428 March 1905) was a British Conservative politician.

Background and education
Charles Bowyer Adderley was the eldest son of Charles Clement Adderley (d. 1818), offspring of an old Staffordshire family, and his wife, daughter of Sir Edmund Cradock-Hartopp, 1st Baronet. Adderley inherited Hams Hall, Warwickshire, and the valuable estates of his great-uncle, Charles Bowyer Adderley, in 1826. He was educated at Christ Church, Oxford, where he graduated with a Bachelor of Arts in 1838.

Political career
In 1841, Adderley entered the House of Commons as Member of Parliament for North Staffordshire, retaining his seat until 1878, when he was created Baron Norton. 

Adderley's ministerial career began in 1858, when he was appointed President of the Board of Health and Vice-president of the Committee of the Council on Education in Lord Derby's short ministry. Again under Lord Derby, he was Under-Secretary of State for the Colonies from 1866 to 1868, being in charge of the act which created the Dominion of Canada, and from 1874 to 1878, he was President of the Board of Trade. 

He was sworn of the Privy Council in 1858, was appointed a Knight Commander of the Order of St Michael and St George (KCMG) in the 1869 Birthday Honours, and, in 1878, he was elevated to the peerage as Baron Norton, of Norton-on-the-Moors in the County of Stafford. 

Norton was a strong churchman and especially interested in education and the colonies. He joined the Canterbury Association on 27 March 1848 and was a member of the management committee from the beginning. In 1852/53, he paid £500 towards the costs of the closure of the association.

Family
In 1842 he married Julia Anne Eliza (1820–1887), oldest daughter of Chandos Leigh, 1st Baron Leigh, by whom he had several sons. His eldest son Charles Leigh Adderley succeeded him in the barony. Another son, the Hon. James Granville Adderley, vicar of Saltley, became well known as an advocate of Christian socialism. His daughter Isabel married in 1876 Vauncey Harpur Crewe of Calke Abbey, later 10th Baronet.

Tributes
Adderley Street is a famous street in Cape Town, South Africa, considered the main street of the central business district. In 1850, the Mayor of Cape Town, Hercules Jarvis, named it to honour Adderley who had fought successfully against a proposal to make Cape Town into a penal colony.

In Birmingham, Adderley donated  of land to create Adderley Park, which he managed privately from 1855 to 1864. He also donated land for the construction of St Saviour's Church, Saltley, St Peter's College, Saltley and the reformatory on the Fordrough, later called Norton Boys' Home. In 1879 Lord Norton sold Whitacre Lodge to the city for the construction of the  Shustoke Reservoir, the largest single source of water for Birmingham until the Elan/Claerwen scheme was completed.

In Uppingham, Rutland, where he owned property, both Adderley Street and Norton Street are named after him.

Adderley Head, a headland between Lyttelton Harbour and Port Levy, near Canterbury, New Zealand, is named after him.

Arms

References

External links 
 
 

1814 births
1905 deaths
Barons in the Peerage of the United Kingdom
Adderley, Charles
English justices of the peace
Members of the Cabinet of the United Kingdom
Members of the Privy Council of the United Kingdom
Knights Commander of the Order of St Michael and St George
Adderley, Charles
Adderley, Charles
Adderley, Charles
Adderley, Charles
Adderley, Charles
Adderley, Charles
Adderley, Charles
Adderley, Charles
UK MPs who were granted peerages
Members of the Canterbury Association
Presidents of the Board of Trade
Alumni of Christ Church, Oxford
Peers of the United Kingdom created by Queen Victoria